28 Weeks Later: Original Motion Picture Soundtrack is the accompanying soundtrack album composed by John Murphy, for the 2007 film of the same name. It was exclusively released to the iTunes Store on 12 June 2007. It was released by La-La Land Records in CD format on the 2 June 2009 as a limited edition, of which only 1500 copies were made, which included an interview with composer John Murphy as the final track.

iTunes track listing

2009 La-La Land Records Album

References

28 Days Later
2009 soundtrack albums
Horror film soundtracks